Brebrovac is a settlement in the Jastrebarsko administrative area of Zagreb County, Croatia. As of 2011, it had a population of 74.

References

Populated places in Zagreb County